Pseudochromis colei, the false bandit dottyback, is a species of ray-finned fish from the in the Philippines in the Western Pacific, which is a member of the family Pseudochromidae.

References

colei
Taxa named by Albert William Herre
Fish described in 1933